Empress Gao may refer to:

Empresses with the surname Gao
Empress Gao (Xuanwu), empress of the Chinese/Xianbei dynasty Northern Wei
Empress Gao (Eastern Wei), empress of the Chinese/Xianbei dynasty Eastern Wei
Empress Gao (Xiaowu), empress of the Chinese/Xianbei dynasty Northern Wei
Empress Gao (Former Shu), empress of the Chinese state Former Shu
Empress Gao (Song dynasty), wife of Emperor Yingzong of Song
Gao Guiying, empress of the Shun Dynasty of Chinese peasant rebellion leader Li Zicheng

Empresses with the title Empress Gao
Empress Lü Zhi, the wife of Emperor Gaozu of the Han Dynasty
Empress Dowager Bo, the concubine of Emperor Gaozu, posthumously honored Empress Gao in place of Empress Lü
Empress Ma (Hongwu), wife of the Hongwu Emperor
Empress Xiaocigao (Qing dynasty), concubine of Nurhaci

See also
Empress Cao (disambiguation)

Gao